The 1911 New South Wales Rugby Football League premiership was the fourth season of Sydney’s top-level rugby league club competition, Australia’s first. Eight teams from across the city contested during the season for the premiership and the Royal Agricultural Society Challenge Shield.

The League’s turnover for the 1911 season was £15,889, up £2,477 on the previous year.

Teams
For the first time in its short history, the premiership consisted of the same teams for two consecutive seasons. The same eight teams from the 1910 season played in 1911.
 Annandale
 Balmain, formed on January 23, 1908, at Balmain Town Hall
 Eastern Suburbs, formed on January 24, 1908, at Paddington Town Hall
 Glebe, formed on January 9, 1908
 Newtown, formed on January 14, 1908
 North Sydney, formed on February 7, 1908, at the North Sydney School of Arts in Mount Street
 South Sydney, formed on January 17, 1908, at Redfern Town Hall
 Western Suburbs, formed on February 4, 1908

Ladder

Finals
The finals system used for the 1910 season was similar in the 1911 season. The top two teams at the end of the year were to play each other in a final to decide the premiership, but in the event of the minor premiers losing, they were deemed to have the "right of challenge" to play a Grand Final. However, because both Eastern Suburbs and South Sydney finished on equal premiership points in second place, a playoff was used to decide who would play minor premiers Glebe in the final.

Eastern Suburbs ended up beating local rivals South Sydney 23-10 at the Sports Ground in front of 14,000 people on September 2, 1911, to win the play-off in order to play minor premiers Glebe. The following week, Eastern Suburbs beat Glebe in front of 16,000 at the Agricultural Ground 22-9. Glebe immediately exercised their right for a rematch the following week for a match to be held at the Agricultural Ground on September 16, 1911.

Final

After Glebe won the toss, Dally Messenger kicked off at 3:31pm on what was a very windy Saturday afternoon. Glebe winger Cubitt scored early and Easts were only able to post a penalty goal in the first half and trailed 5–2 at the break.
The referee was Tom McMahon (the elder of the two Sydney top-grade referees of that name) who in the first half sent off Glebe’s Sid Pert and Rooster Larry O'Malley, the former Australian Kangaroo captain.
Early in the second half, Cubitt scored again for Glebe to take an 8–4 lead. However, in the final ten minutes, Eastern Suburbs were able to score a try after a high kick was misjudged by the Glebe fullback, and Charlie Lees took the loose ball to score a try. Dally Messenger converted to take the lead 9–8 with only minutes to play, and consolidated the win with another penalty kick to win the game 11–8 for the Roosters and allowing them to take their first premiership in front of 20,000 people.

 Eastern Suburbs 11
(Tries: Lees. Goals: Messenger 3. Fld Goal: Messenger )

defeated

 Glebe 8 (Tries; C Cubitt 2 Goals: 1.)

Notable events
On June 22, the Sydney Cricket Ground staged its first game of rugby league. NSW defeated New Zealand in the match, 35–10.

References

External links
 Rugby League Tables - Notes AFL Tables
 Rugby League Tables - Season 1911 AFL Tables
 Premiership History and Statistics RL1908
 1911 - Minor Premiers Glebe Beaten By Messenger RL1908
 Hadden, Steve  History of the NSWRL Finals
 Results: 1911-20 at rabbitohs.com.au

New South Wales Rugby League premiership
NSWRFL Season